In contrast with the political party systems of many nations, Canadian political parties at the federal level are often only loosely connected with parties at the provincial level, despite having similar names and policy positions. One exception is the New Democratic Party, which is organizationally integrated with most of its provincial counterparts including a shared membership.

Current parties

House of Commons

Represented parties

Registered parties 
The following political parties are registered with Elections Canada and eligible to run candidates in future federal elections, but are not currently represented in the House of Commons.

Eligible parties
Eligible parties have applied to Elections Canada and met all of the legal requirements to be registered, other than running a candidate in a general election or by-election.  Such parties are eligible to run candidates in federal elections but will not be considered "registered" by Elections Canada until they have registered a candidate in an election or by-election. As of August 2022, the following are eligible parties:

Non-party parliamentary groups
At various points both the House of Commons and Senate have included non-party parliamentary groups, also called caucuses. These groups are unaffiliated with registered political parties, are not registered with Elections Canada, and do not run candidates in Canadian federal elections. Essentially, these parliamentary groups are equivalent to political parties in the legislative context, but do not exist in an electoral capacity.

Parliamentary groups in the House of Commons of Canada are typically made up of MPs that separate from a party over leadership conflicts. Notable past parliamentary groups in the House of Commons include the Ginger Group (1924–1932; split from Progressive Party), Democratic Representative Caucus (2001–2002; split from Canadian Alliance), and Québec debout (2018; split from Bloc Québécois).

Senate
The Senate of Canada currently has three non-party parliamentary groups: the Independent Senators Group (ISG), the Canadian Senators Group (CSG), and the Progressive Senate Group (PSG). These three groups do not share a formal ideology, platform, or membership in any one political party; the caucuses primarily serve to provide organizational support and better leverage parliamentary resources. Conservative senators remain formally affiliated with the Conservative Party of Canada.

Historical parties

House of Commons

Registered parties 
These are political parties which either ceased to exist before Elections Canada was formed, or were once registered with Elections Canada but have become de-registered or ceased to exist due to dissolution.

Non-party parliamentary groups

Designations used by single candidates 
 Nationalist Liberal (II) (Fleming Blanchard McCurdy), 1920 – McCurdy won a by-election under the Nationalist Liberal designation, but sat with the National Liberal and Conservative Party caucus
 Protectionist (Joseph-Édouard Moranville), 1926
 Franc Lib (I) (Alfred Edward Watts), 1930
 Prohibition Party (Edwin Clarke Appleby), 1930
 Parti national social chrétien (Robert Rae Manville), 1934–1940
 Anti-Communist (I) (Jean Tissot), 1935
 Verdun (Hervé Ferland), 1935
 Veterans Party (Alloys Reginald Sprenger), 1935
 Technocrat (Joseph McCrae Newman), 1935
 Anti-Conscriptionist (Louis-Gérard Gosselin), 1940
 Social Credit-National Unity (Harry Watson Arnold), 1940
 National-Unity (Robert Rae Manville), 1940
 Trades Union (Nigel Morgan), 1945
 Autonomist candidate (Paul Massé), 1947
 Nationalist (II) (Adrien Arcand), 1949, 1953
 Christian Liberal (Howard A. Prentice), 1953
 Anti-Communist (II) (Patrick Walsh), 1953
 Canadian Democrat (Gerry Goeujon), 1957
 National Credit Control (John Bernard Ball), 1957
 Capital familial (Henri-Georges Grenier), 1957–1962
 Liberal Conservative Coalition (George Rolland), 1957
 Parti ouvrier canadien (Jean-Jacques Rouleau), 1958
 League for Socialist Action, 1961–1977
 Co-operative Builders of Canada (Edgar-Bernard Charron), 1962
 All Canadian Party (John Darby Naismith), 1962–1962
 Parti humain familial (Henri-Georges Grenier), 1964
 Droit vital personnel (Henri-Georges Grenier), 1965
 Progressive Workers Movement (Jerry Le Bourdais), 1965
 Esprit Social (Henri-Georges Grenier), 1967–1971
 Franc Lib (II) (Jean-Roger Marcotte), 1968
 National Socialist (Martin K. Weiche), 1968
 New Canada Party (Fred Reiner), 1968
 Nationalist Party of Canada (Bob Smith), founded 1977
 Christian Democrat Party of Canada (Sydney Thompson), 1981
 Work Less Party (Betty Krawczyk), 2007–2010
 Party for Accountability, Competency and Transparency (formerly Online Party) (Michael Nicula), 2012–2016
 Alliance of the North (François Bélanger), 2013–2019
 The Bridge Party of Canada (David Berlin), 2015–2017
 Seniors Party of Canada (Margaret Leigh Fairbairn), 2014–2016
 Canada Party (II) (Jim Pankiw) 2015–2016

Senate

Unofficial designations and parties who never ran candidates 
The following parties do not appear on the federal election archive. They either did not run candidates in any election or ran candidates as independents.
 Aboriginal Peoples Party of Canada (founded in 2005)
 Action Canada (founded in 1971)
 Canadian Labour Party, 1917–1929
 Canadian Party for Renewal, 1993
 Canadian Union of Fascists, 1930s
 Christian Credit Party, 1982–1983
 Christian Freedom Party of Canada, c. 1988 – c. 1996 (an extension of the Social Credit Party)
 Movement for an Independent Socialist Canada, 1974
 National Party of Canada (I), 1979–1980s
 New Capitalist Party, 1965
 New Constitution Party of Canada (an unregistered party founded in 2015)
 North American Labour Party, 1970s
 National Unity Party, 1938–1949
 People's Co-operative Commonwealth Federation 1945
 Option Canada (founded in 1991)
 Revolutionary Workers League, 1977–1989
 Workers' Communist Party of Canada, 1972–1980

Pre-confederation political parties
 Reform Party (pre-Confederation)

Name changes

Communist Party
The Communist Party of Canada changed its name multiple times in its history. It was founded as the Communist Party of Canada in 1921. It was underground until 1924, and founded a public face, Workers' Party of Canada, from 1922 until 1924 when the Communist Party was legalized. From 1938 until 1943 its candidates ran under the banner Unity or United Progressive, and won one seat. The Communist Party was again banned in 1940, but from 1943 operated under the name Labor-Progressive Party. It won one seat under this name in a 1943 by-election, which it retained in 1945. In 1959 it reverted to the name Communist Party of Canada and has kept that name to the present.

The Marxist–Leninist Party of Canada unofficially uses the name "Communist Party of Canada (Marxist–Leninist)", but Elections Canada does not allow it to be registered by that name because of potential confusion with the Communist Party of Canada.

Labour Party
Labour Party candidates ran under numerous different designations:
 Conservative-Labour (1872–1875)
 Farmer Labour
 Farmer-United Labour
 Labour-Farmer
 Liberal-Labour (1926–1968)
 National Labour (1940)
 United Farmers-Labour (1920)
 United Farmers of Ontario-Labour (1919–1940)

Liberal Party
During Robert Borden's coalition government of 1917–1920, the Liberal Party of Canada split into two groups: the Liberal–Unionist who supported the coalition and the Laurier Liberals who opposed it.

Liberal-Progressive
Some Liberal-Progressive candidates used the designations:
Liberal-Labour-Progressive or
National Liberal Progressive.

New Democratic Party
The Co-operative Commonwealth Federation used the name New Party from 1958 to 1961 while it was transitioning to become the New Democratic Party. In French, the party used a literal translation of its name, Fédération du Commonwealth Coopératif, from until 1955.

Conservative Party
The first Conservative Party used several different names during its existence:
Liberal-Conservative Party (some MPs until 1911),
Unionist Party (1917–1921),
National Liberal and Conservative Party (1920–1921),
National Government (1940),
Progressive Conservative Party (1942–2003)

The second (and current) Conservative Party of Canada was a merger of the Canadian Alliance and the Progressive Conservative Party.

Progressive Party and United Farmers
Some candidates for the Progressive Party of Canada used United Farmer designations:
Farmer (1925 & 1930),
United Farmers of Canada,
United Farmers of Alberta, or
United Farmers of Ontario.

Rhinoceros Party
The first Rhinoceros Party disbanded in 1993. When it was revived in 2006 it used the name "neorhino.ca". The party changed its name to Rhinoceros Party in 2010.

Social Credit Party and Ralliement créditiste
Some Ralliement créditiste used the name Ralliement des créditistes from 1963 to 1967. One candidate used the designation Candidats des électeurs in 1957 and 1958. Others used the name Union des électeurs, although this was never formally registered.

In the 1940 election, 17 candidates ran jointly with the Social Credit Party under the name New Democracy.

See also 

 Federal political financing in Canada
 List of political parties in Canada

Notes

References

External links 
 Registered Political Parties and Parties Eligible for Registration

Political parties